Jama (also Romanized as Jamā; also known as Ḩājjī Jamā‘ and Jom‘eh) is a village in Dust Mohammad Rural District, in the Central District of Hirmand County, Sistan and Baluchestan Province, Iran. At the 2006 census, its population was 365, in 78 families.

References 

Populated places in Hirmand County